Xiong is the pinyin romanization of the Chinese surname 熊 (Xióng). It is 41st in the Hundred Family Surnames, contained in the verse 熊紀舒屈 (Xiong, Ji, Shu, Qu).

Romanizations
熊 is also romanized as Hsiung2 in Wade-Giles. It is Hung or Hong in Cantonese; Him in Hokkien, Hong or Yoong in Hakka; Hiōng in Gan; Hùng in Vietnamese; and Xyooj in Hmong.

Note that "Hong" and "Hung" may also refer to the unrelated surname 洪.

Distribution
熊 is the 71st most common surname in mainland China.

Although Chinese make up the largest part of America's Asian and Pacific Islander population, none of the romanizations of 熊 appeared among the 1000 most common surnames during the AD 2000 US census.

Origins
Xiong's literal meaning is "bear", Xiong (熊) is branch to Mi (surname) (芈) of Chu (state).

Xiong traces back to the legendary Chinese culture hero Fuxi, who was also styled "Huangxiong" (lit. "Yellow Bear"). One archaic form of the surname combined this into a single character .

Yuxiong (鬻熊), the progenitor of Chu, was the tutor of King Wen of Zhou and died during his reign.

After Zhou overthrew the Shang Dynasty, Yuxiong's descendants took Xiong as their clan name and remained prominent at court.

King Wen's grandson King Cheng of Zhou (reigned 10421021 BC) awarded Yuxiong's great-grandson Xiong Yi the hereditary title of zǐ (roughly "viscount") and the fiefdom of Chu. As it grew in power and importance, the Xiong dynasty formed its ruling house and the ruling houses of some of its successor states. To this day, the surname remains prominent in the provinces comprising the former territory of Chu.

List of persons with the surname

Xiong

 Xiong Ni, Chinese diver and triple Olympic gold medalist
 Xiong Qinglai, Chinese mathematician
 Xiong Xianghui, Chinese diplomat
 Xiong Shili, Chinese philosopher
 Xiong Xiling, Chinese philanthropist and politician
 Xiong Zhaoren, Chinese general
 Jeffery Xiong, United States chess grandmaster
 Dylan Xiong Ziqi, Chinese artist

Hsiung
 Chao Agnes Hsiung, Taiwanese biostatistician
 Hsiung Shih-I, Chinese writer
 Tiffany Hsiung, Canadian documentary filmmaker

Hung
 Lynn Hung, Chinese model

Song
 Brenda Song, Hmong American actress

Yoong
 Alex Yoong, Malaysian race car driver

References

Chinese-language surnames
Multiple Chinese surnames